Marinus "Rinus" Schaap (22 February 1922 – 5 June 2006) was a Dutch footballer. He played in thirteen matches for the Netherlands national football team between 1948 and 1956. He was also part of the Dutch squad for the 1948 Summer Olympics, but he did not play in any matches.

References

External links
 

1922 births
2006 deaths
Dutch footballers
Netherlands international footballers
Sportspeople from Hilversum
Association football forwards
Toulouse FC (1937) players
Racing Club de France Football players
SC 't Gooi players
Sportclub Enschede players
Dutch expatriate footballers
Expatriate footballers in France
Dutch expatriate sportspeople in France
Footballers from North Holland